Vanineh or Vanaineh or Voneyneh, also rendered as Vanenah,  may refer to:
 Vanineh-ye Olya
 Vanineh-ye Sofla